"If I Can't" is a song by American rapper 50 Cent, released as the fourth and final single from his debut album, Get Rich or Die Tryin' (2003). The single was released through Interscope Records, Dr. Dre's Aftermath Entertainment, Eminem's Shady Records and 50 Cent's G-Unit Records. The song is one of four on the album to be produced by hip hop producer Dr. Dre, with co-production from frequent collaborator Mike Elizondo. Lyrically, the song describes how 50 Cent believes that "if I [he] can't do it [referring to anything], it can't be done".

Upon its release, the song was a reasonable commercial success. However, it did not match the commercial success of the album's three previous singles, only peaking at number 76 on the Billboard Hot 100 in America, where the three previous singles had all peaked within the top three. Nevertheless, it did peak in the upper regions of several national charts - most successfully in the UK, where it peaked at number ten after being released as a double A-side with the G-Unit single "Poppin' Them Thangs".

Background 
{{quote|"Before my album ''Get Rich or Die Tryin came out, there was a big debate about what the first single should be. Jimmy Iovine thought it should be the one that Dr. Dre produced, 'If I Can't'. But Em wanted 'In da Club'. In the end they were deadlocked, so they asked me and I told them, real quiet, 'In da Club'." – 50 Cent}}

Released in 2003, it reached No. 76 in the US, becoming 50 Cent's sixth Hot 100 entry, but nonetheless his weakest charting single at that time. It also peaked at No. 10 in the UK as a double A-side with "Poppin' Them Thangs" (G-Unit). The song was written by 50 Cent, Dr. Dre, and Mike Elizondo, with production by Dr. Dre, and Mike Elizondo.

 Music video 
At the start there is a white man introducing 50 Cent; it then consists of video footage of 50 Cent in different concerts and documentaries. All of the members of G-Unit are seen in the video. It is very similar to the music video to Eminem's 2003 single "Sing for the Moment".

Track listing
 UK CD single "If I Can't" - 3:16
 "Poppin' Them Thangs" (with G-Unit) - 3:45
 "In Da Club" (Live in New York) - 4:52
 "If I Can't" (Music Video) - 3:24
 "Poppin' Them Things" (Music Video) - 3:48

 German CD single "If I Can't" - 3:16
 "Poppin' Them Things" (with G-Unit) - 3:45

 Australian CD single'''
 "If I Can't" - 3:16
 "In Da Club" (Live in New York) - 4:52
 "What Up Gangsta" (Live in New York) - 4:08
 "If I Can't" (Instrumental) - 3:08

Charts

Weekly charts

Year-end charts

Certifications

References 

2003 singles
50 Cent songs
Songs written by 50 Cent
Song recordings produced by Dr. Dre
Shady Records singles
Aftermath Entertainment singles
Interscope Records singles
Song recordings produced by Mike Elizondo